Pyle USA is an American company that specializes in audio equipment and consumer electronics, primarily sold at big-box stores and through online retailers. The company is headquartered in Brooklyn, New York, and the company's current president is Mr. Abe Brach.

History
Pyle Audio was founded in 1960 as a manufacturer of audio equipment and stereo systems. Pyle manufactures a wide array of speaker systems and consumer electronics, including televisions, DVD players, musical instruments, multimeters, watches, metal detectors, tablet PCs, rechargeable batteries, projectors, digital cameras and a wide array of other electronic devices.

In the 2000s, Pyle began manufacturing small kitchen appliances for home and office use.

References

External links
 Official website

American companies established in 1960
History of radio
Electronics companies of the United States
Consumer electronics brands
Companies based in New York City
Manufacturing companies established in 1960
American brands
Radio manufacturers